Docosatetraenoylethanolamide (DEA) (Adrenoyl-ethanolamide) (Adrenoyl-EA) is an endogenous ethanolamide that has been shown to act on the cannabinoid (CB1) receptor. DEA is similar in structure to anandamide (AEA, a recognized endogenous ligand for the CB1 receptor), containing docosatetraenoic acid in place of arachidonic acid. While DEA has been shown to bind to the CB1 receptor with similar potency and efficacy as AEA, its role as a cannabinergic neurotransmitter is not well understood.

Docosatetraenoylethanolamide (DEA) has been found in Tropaeolum tuberosum (Mashua) and Leonotis leonurus (Wild Dagga / Lion's Tail).

References

Fatty acid amides
Endocannabinoids
Neurotransmitters